Sonia Lafuente Martínez (born 7 December 1991) is a Spanish former figure skater. She is a six-time Spanish national champion. Lafuente became the first Spanish skater to medal on the ISU Junior Grand Prix circuit when she won silver at the 2006 Mexico Cup.

Personal life
Lafuente was born on 7 December 1991 in Las Palmas de Gran Canaria, Canary Islands. She is a university student, studying sports. She intends to spread her studies over several years in order to accommodate her career.

Career
Lafuente began skating at age four, after her parents took her and her sister to a newly opened rink in Madrid. Carolina Sanz and Ivan Saez were her coaches for much of her career. In the 2003–04 season, Lafuente made her international debut as a novice, and finished with the bronze medal at the Merano Cup, an event she would win one year later. She began competing in junior internationals in 2005–06.

In the 2006–07 season, Lafuente became the first Spanish skater to win a Junior Grand Prix medal. She trained mainly in Majadahonda.

In 2008, Lafuente made her debut at the European Championships. She was 30th at her first Senior Worlds. The next season, she finished 23rd at Europeans and 26th at Worlds, which did not qualify her for the 2010 Winter Olympics. However, she was able to qualify for the Olympics with an 8th-place finish at the 2009 Nebelhorn Trophy, and finished 22nd in Vancouver. The next season, she received her first Grand Prix assignments, and finished 10th and 7th, respectively, at the 2010 Skate Canada International and the 2010 Trophee Eric Bompard. She was 12th at the European Championships but did not qualify for the free skate at Worlds.

Lafuente was 9th at the 2011 Nebelhorn Trophy, 7th at the 2011 Trophee Eric Bompard, 5th at the 2011 Golden Spin of Zagreb, and 15th at the 2012 European Championships in Sheffield.

Lafuente finished 7th at the 2013 European Championships and earned the minimum score to compete at the 2013 World Championships where she was 22nd.

The 2013 Nebelhorn Trophy was the last opportunity to qualify for the 2014 Winter Olympics. Lafuente was unable to win one of the six available ladies' berths, finishing 26th. In October 2013, she decided to move to Toronto, Ontario, Canada to train in Brian Orser's group. In 2014, she began working with Ghisland Briand and Tracy Wilson as her coaches.

After finishing 33rd at the 2016 European Championships, Lafuente decided to leave competition for a year.

In 2018, Lafuente was the sole performer in the music video for the song Pausa, from the album Autoterapia, by the Spanish band Izal.

Programs

Competitive highlights
GP: Grand Prix; CS: Challenger Series; JGP: Junior Grand Prix

2005–present

Novice career

References

External links

 

1991 births
Living people
Sportspeople from Las Palmas
Spanish female single skaters
Figure skaters at the 2010 Winter Olympics
Olympic figure skaters of Spain
Universiade medalists in figure skating
Universiade silver medalists for Spain
Competitors at the 2011 Winter Universiade
Competitors at the 2015 Winter Universiade
Competitors at the 2013 Winter Universiade
21st-century Spanish women